Capitol Square is a public square in Downtown Columbus, Ohio. The square includes the Ohio Statehouse, its  Capitol Grounds, as well as the buildings and features surrounding the square. The Capitol Grounds are surrounded on the north and west by Broad and High Streets, the main thoroughfares of the city since its founding, forming the city's 100 percent corner. The grounds are surrounded by 3rd Street on the east and State Street on the south. The oldest building on Capitol Square, the Ohio Statehouse, is the center of the state government, and in the rough geographic center of Capitol Square, Columbus, and Ohio.

History
The  statehouse grounds were donated by four prominent Franklinton landholders to form the new state capitol. As the city's downtown began to empty in the mid-20th century, several buildings on the square were demolished. A construction boom downtown in the 1970s and 80s led to nearly all spaces being occupied again. The last large empty parcels, on 3rd Street, are aimed to be developed in the 2020s.

Attributes

Buildings and structures
 Center: Ohio Statehouse, Capitol Atrium, and Senate Building

High Street
 Vern Riffe Center for Government and the Arts
 Huntington Center
 Huntington National Bank Building

Broad Street
 Broad & High building
 8 on the Square
 New Hayden Building
 Hayden Building
 Rhodes State Office Tower
 60 E. Broad St. (former COTA office)
 62 E. Broad St. (home to the Columbus Dispatch)
 64-66 E. Broad St.
 Key Bank Building

Third Street
 Trinity Episcopal Church
 PNC Bank Building
 Columbus Dispatch Building
 Central Ohio Federal Savings and Loan building

State Street
 Sheraton Columbus Hotel at Capitol Square
 Capitol Square skyscraper
 Ohio Theatre
 Fifth Third Center

Street corners
 Northwest: One Columbus Center
 Northeast: Chase Tower
 Southwest: National Exchange Bank building
 Southeast: U.S. Post Office and Courthouse

Buildings formerly on Capitol Square include the Neil House hotel (three buildings which existed on the square), the Columbus Board of Trade Building, the Hartman Building and Theater, the former Columbus City Hall, former locations of the First Congregational Church and First Presbyterian Church, an early Huntington Bank, the Deshler Hotel, a prior location of the Downtown YMCA, and 5 and 7 South High Street, commercial buildings constructed c. 1840.

Public art

 Governor James A. Rhodes (1982)
 The Doughboy (1930)
 Intersect (1992)
 The Newsboy (2018)
 Ohio Holocaust and Liberators Memorial (2014)
 Ohio Veterans Plaza
 Statue of Christopher Columbus (c. 1890–1892)
 The Spirit of '98 (1928)
 These Are My Jewels (1893)
 William McKinley Monument (1907)
 former: Dr. Samuel Mitchel Smith and Sons Memorial Fountain (1880)

Tourism
As the center of downtown Columbus, the square has high resident and visitor foot traffic. Programs for tourists include the Columbus Art Walk's Capitol Square tour, taking visitors around historical and architectural sites, sculptures, and other landmarks.

Events

Protests
Capitol Square is the location of many protests held in the city. Recent protests have included those against Ohio's stay-at-home order in the COVID-19 pandemic and against the handling of the murder of George Floyd. Riots and protests over George Floyd took place in the city, centered on the square from May 28 into July, with early violent protests leading to damaged storefronts across downtown Columbus, with graffiti, trash, and looting around much of downtown.

Gallery

See also
 Columbus Civic Center
 Capitol Square Review & Advisory Board v. Pinette

References

External links
 

Downtown Columbus, Ohio
Geography of Columbus, Ohio
Ohio Statehouse
Parks in Columbus, Ohio
Squares in Ohio
Tourist attractions in Columbus, Ohio
Odonyms referring to a building
Broad Street (Columbus, Ohio)
High Street (Columbus, Ohio)